Bicycle and Other Poems (1970) is the debut poetry collection by Australian poet and author David Malouf.

The collection consists of 41 poems, several of which were previously published in various Australian poetry and general magazines, with the majority published here for the first time.

Contents

Critical reception
In a survey of three poetry collections from the University of Queensland Press,  Geoffrey Page in The Canberra Times called this book "remarkable for its perception (particularly where personal experience is made universal) and for its verbal freshness." He then went on: "Malouf, unlike many poets, is able to find in his past experiences which don't merely illustrate certain established themes but have a specific quality of their own."

Jan Harry in Poetry Magazine found that a number of Malouf's poems "present their world through a steady build up of objects. It is a world that can be seen, felt, heard and consequently one that can be readily entered into...the surface is crowded with small sharp or bright details that create a kind of tapestry weave."

See also
 1970 in Australian literature
 1970 in poetry

References

Australian poetry collections
1970 poetry books